The Shanghai Academy of Spaceflight Technology (SAST) is a Chinese space agency and subordinate of China Aerospace Science and Technology Corporation (CASC), it is referred to as The Eighth Academy of CASC. The agency was established in August 1961 as Shanghai Second Bureau of Electromechanical Industry, but was later renamed to Shanghai Academy of Spaceflight Technology in 1993.

Space flight programmes 
SAST designs, develops, and manufactures launch vehicles as well as components. They designed and manufactured the Long March 2D, the entire Long March 4 series and FB-1 rockets. The FB-1 launched three military satellites, no details of which have been published. SAST was held responsible for the FB-1 failures between 1973 and 1981.

References

External links 
 

Aerospace companies of China
Space program of the People's Republic of China
Research institutes in China
China National Space Administration
Space agencies
Aerospace companies
China, PR